CFH Racing was an American auto racing team that competed in the IndyCar Series The team was founded in August 2014 via a merger between Sarah Fisher Hartman Racing and Ed Carpenter Racing, and debuted in 2015. CFH Racing was co-owned by Ed Carpenter, the only owner/driver in the IndyCar Series, Sarah Fisher, nine-time Indianapolis 500 starter and the first woman to win a pole position for a major open-wheel event, and Kansas businessman Wink Hartman. Based in Speedway, Indiana, the team fielded the No. 20 for Carpenter on ovals and for Luca Filippi on road courses. They also fielded the No. 67 for Josef Newgarden and the No. 6 for J. R. Hildebrand.

History
On August 16, 2014, NBCSN journalist Robin Miller reported that Ed Carpenter would merge his team with Sarah Fisher Hartman Racing, whom he had raced for in 2011; the two teams officially announced the merger at the Milwaukee Mile a week later. The next day, SFHR driver Josef Newgarden was re-signed to a one-year extension to race with CFH. On August 27, the team announced they would run with Chevrolet engines, and a month later, Carpenter confirmed Fuzzy's Award Winning Vodka would follow the team to sponsor the 20. The team made its debut with Carpenter driving in testing for the Firestone Tire and Rubber Company at Indianapolis Motor Speedway from September 23–24, followed by a session at Mid-Ohio Sports Car Course with Newgarden and Mike Conway.

On January 30, 2015, Luca Filippi was hired by the team to contest the road and street circuits. On February 23, Newgarden acquired sponsorship from Century 21 Real Estate for the Indianapolis 500, and his number was changed from No. 67 to No. 21 for the race. On April 7, J. R. Hildebrand was hired to race in the two Indianapolis races with the No. 6 car.

On January 28, 2016, dropping oil prices forced Hartman to withdraw from IndyCar. Afterwards, Fisher withdrew as well, and the team was rebranded back to Ed Carpenter Racing after just one season.

Racing results

Complete IndyCar Series results
(key)

IndyCar wins

References

External links

 

IndyCar Series teams
American auto racing teams
Auto racing teams established in 2014
Auto racing teams disestablished in 2016
2014 establishments in Indiana
Defunct companies based in Indianapolis
2016 disestablishments in Indiana